Leucanopsis cirphis is a moth of the family Erebidae. It was described by William Schaus in 1911. It is found in Costa Rica.

References

cirphis
Moths described in 1911